Venator marginatus is a wolf spider (i.e., in the Lycosidae family), endemic to Australia and found in Victoria.

It was described in 1900 by Henry Roughton Hogg.  However, in 2015 Volker Framenau declared it "incerta sedis", stating that it was known from two female specimens, the morphology of whose genitalia failed to match those of the genus. (This view is accepted by the Australian Faunal Directory.)

References 

Spiders described in 1900
Lycosidae
Spiders of Australia